Sacred food as offering is a concept within anthropology regarding the study of food as it relates to religious ritual.

Many religions have prescriptions about the correct preparation and cooking of food, besides the taboos about forbidden subjects. Many religions have special spellings for the food, which sacralize it and, therefore, who will eat it; but there are foods sacred by its inner nature.
In Brazilian Candomblé by example, fish are sacred for their connection to Iemanjá, horns given the relation to Iansã.
Consequently, those foods are considered offerings. This takes place in other religions too.

Some examples include:
coconut: Ganesha in Hinduism 
milk, betel leaves: Shiva in Hinduism
flowers, tulsi and fruit: Krishna in Hinduism
Oxalá in Candomblé (see above)
bread: the body of Christ in Catholicism
the challah in Judaism is symbol of divine presence in shabat
chestnut: Befana
coca leaf: for the Andean cultures
Leola's Maize Corn: Amerindian goddess of prosperity in cajun of Louisiana

See also
Anthropology of religion
Libation

Anthropology of religion
Religious food and drink